Neil Munro "Bunny" Roger (9 June 1911 – 27 April 1997) was an English couturier and socialite. Roger's best known contribution to fashion was his popularization of Capri pants.

Early years
Neil Munro Roger was born 9 June 1911 in London to Sir Alexander Roger and Helen Stuart Clark, both from Scotland. He attended the Loretto School and read History at Balliol College, Oxford for a year; he then studied drawing at The Ruskin. He was expelled from Oxford for alleged homosexual activities.

Career
In 1937, Roger established his dressmakers, Neil Roger, in Great Newport Street, London. One of his clients was Vivien Leigh.

In the Second World War, he was commissioned in the Rifle Brigade in 1941 and served in Italy and North Africa. Roger was a war hero known for his courage under fire. A story that may be apocryphal has him replying to a sergeant's question regarding approaching Germans, "When in doubt, powder heavily."

Following the war, he was invited to run the couture department at Fortnum & Mason. He invested in the House of Amies, and his stake was later acquired by Debenhams in 1973.

Capri pants, introduced by fashion designer Sonja de Lennart in 1948, were popularized by her and Roger.

Roger was a clotheshorse who bought up to fifteen bespoke suits a year and four pairs of bespoke shoes or boots to go with each suit; each suit was said to have cost around £2,000. He favoured a neo-Edwardian look: four-buttoned jackets with broad shoulders, narrow waists, and long skirts. He favoured narrow trousers and a high-crowned bowler hat. He was particularly fond of spectator shoes and ruby cufflinks.

Roger was known for the lavish and outrageous parties that he held throughout his life. These events were often themed, as in the Diamond, Amethyst, and Flame Balls held to celebrate his 60th, 70th, and 80th birthdays, respectively.

Death
Roger died in London on 27 April 1997. He was 85 years old.

References

1911 births
1997 deaths
English people of Scottish descent
People educated at Loretto School, Musselburgh
Alumni of Balliol College, Oxford
Rifle Brigade officers
British Army personnel of World War II
English fashion designers
English socialites
20th-century English businesspeople
20th-century English LGBT people